The 1917 Canton Bulldogs season was their eleventh season in the Ohio League. The team finished with a 9–1 record and captured their third Ohio League championship.

Schedule

Game notes

References

Canton Bulldogs seasons
Canton Bulldogs Season, 1917
Canton Bulldogs